Ian Speirs Brown (7 July 1925 – 16 March 2019) was an Australian rules footballer who played with Geelong in the Victorian Football League (VFL).

Notes

External links 

1925 births
2019 deaths
Australian rules footballers from Victoria (Australia)
Geelong Football Club players